John St Aubyn (1613–1684) was an English politician who sat in the House of Commons of England in 1640. He served as a colonel in the parliamentary army in the English Civil War.

St Aubyn was the eldest son of John St. Aubyn of Clowance, Cornwall and his wife Catherine Arundell, daughter of John Arundell of Trerice. He entered Middle Temple in 1631.  In April 1640, St Aubyn was elected Member of Parliament for Tregoney.  He became commissioner for assessment for Cornwall, commissioner for sequestrations and commissioner for levying of money in 1643. In 1644 for was commissioner for execution of ordinances and became High Sheriff of Cornwall to 1645. He became recorder of St Ives in 1646.

St Aubyn was a colonel in the parliamentary army and took part in the capture of St Michael's Mount in 1646. He was appointed Governor  of the Mount in 1647 when it became a prison.

St Aubyn became freeman of Plymouth in 1648 and also commissioner for militia in  Cornwall. In 1649 he became Vice-Admiral for South Cornwall and in 1650 he became a J.P. until 1653. He became a commissioner for security in 1655. In 1656 he was elected MP for Cornwall in the Second Protectorate Parliament. He was commissioner for assessment for Cornwall and became a JP again in 1657. He was commissioner for militia in Cornwall in 1659. In April 1659 he was elected MP for St Ives in the Third Protectorate Parliament. In 1659 he purchased St Michael's  Mount from the Bassett family and it became his home. He was one of the Cornish gentry who met at Truro in December 1659 to demand a free Parliament. He was commissioner for assessment for Cornwall again in January 1660 and commissioner for militia for Cornwall again in March 1660.

In April 1660 St Aubyn was re-elected MP for St Ives in the Convention Parliament in a double return. He became colonel of the militia in April 1660. He did not stand for parliament in 1661. He was stannator of Tywarnwhaile in 1663 and commissioner for assessment for Cornwall from 1663 to 1680. He was High Sheriff of Cornwall again in 1666.

St Aubyn married Catherine Godolphin daughter of Francis Godolphin of Treveneage, and had six sons and four daughters. His son John was created baronet and  MP for Mitchell.

References

1613 births
1684 deaths
Members of the pre-1707 English Parliament for constituencies in Cornwall
Roundheads
English MPs 1640 (April)
English MPs 1656–1658
English MPs 1659
English MPs 1660